Ewa Pajor (born 3 December 1996) is a Polish football striker, currently playing for VfL Wolfsburg and the Poland national team.

Club career 
Pajor comes from Pęgów. She started her football training at the age of 8 in Orlęty Wielenin. After graduating from primary school, she moved to Konin and trained with Medyk Konin. On April 14, 2012, she made her Ekstraliga debut, entering the game in the 55th minute of the match against AZS PWSZ Biała Podlaska, winning 3–0. On her debut, she scored two goals. The first goal was scored two minutes after entering the pitch. She became the youngest player ever to play in Ekstraliga at 15 years and 133 days old. To be able to participate in this meeting, a special permit was needed from PZPN, because the regulations only allowed players over 16 to play.

In the 2012–2013 season, together with Medyk, she won the vice-championship and the Polish Cup. In the final match against KP Unia Racibórz, won 2–1, Pajor scored both goals for her team. The seasons 2013/2014 and 2014/2015 turned out to be even more successful for her. Together with Medyk Konin she won the championship and the Polish Cup twice. She played her last match for the Konin team when Medyk defeated Górnik Łęczna in the Polish Cup final 5–0. Pajor scored a hat-trick in this match. In total, for the senior team of Medyka, she scored 74 goals in all official matches, of which 64 in the extra league (in 60 appearances).

In June 2015, she signed a two-year contract with VfL Wolfsburg, which she then extended in December 2017 to be valid until June 30, 2020. In April 2020, Pajor signed a contract extension with Wolfsburg until 2023.

In the 2018–19 season, she won the German Championship, the German Cup, and the title of Bundesliga top scorer, scoring 24 goals in 19 matches.

International career 
At the European Under-17 Championship held in June 2013, together with the Polish U-17 team she won the gold medal. On October 9, she was awarded the UEFA Under-17 Golden Player Award for the best under-17 player in Europe.

She made her debut in the senior Polish national team under coach Wojciech Basiuk, in the match between Poland and the Czech Republic, as part of the Balaton Cup friendly tournament in Hungary, on August 20, 2013. Pajor checked in on the field only in the 75th minute, but in the minute after entering she won a penalty kick, scored by Patrycja Pożerska. In the 84th minute, Pajor scored.

She took part in the 4 to 11 March 2015 competition for the Istria Cup in Croatia, which she won first place with her team in the final against Slovakia.

On September 6, 2022, after scoring three goals against the Kosovo national team, Pajor became the most effective scorer in the history of the Polish national team, ahead of previous record-holder Marta Otrębska.

Career statistics

International

International goals 
Scores and results list Poland's goal tally first, score column indicates score after each Pajor goal.

Honours

 Bundesliga: Winner 2016–17, 2017–18, 2018–19, 2019–20, 2021–22
 DFB-Pokal: Winner 2016, 2017, 2018, 2019, 2020, 2021
 Istria Cup: Winner 2015
 UEFA Women's Under-17 Championship: Winner 2013
 Ekstraliga: Winner 2014, 2015
 Polish Cup: Winner 2013, 2014, 2015
 Runner-up of Poland: (2012/13)
 Polish Championship: (2013/14, 2014/15)
 Champions League Final: (2015/16, 2017/18, 2019/20)

 Individual

 UEFA Under-17 Golden Player: 2013
 Football Player of the Year: 2018, 2019, 2022
 Bundesliga top scorer: (2018/2019)

References

External links
 Player Polish domestic and international stats  at PZPN
 
 
 Ewa Pajor at soccerdonna.de

1996 births
Living people
Polish women's footballers
Poland women's international footballers
Medyk Konin players
VfL Wolfsburg (women) players
Frauen-Bundesliga players
Expatriate women's footballers in Germany
Polish expatriate footballers
Polish expatriate sportspeople in Germany
People from Poddębice County
Sportspeople from Łódź Voivodeship
Women's association football forwards